Eggomania is an action video game released in January 1983 by U.S. Games for the Atari 2600. Similar in design to Kaboom!, which itself is a derivative of the arcade game Avalanche, the objective is to catch eggs in a hat which are thrown by a chicken.

Gameplay

A chicken at the top of the screen moves back and forth, dropping eggs. The paddle controller is used to move a blue bear holding a hat over its head left and right at the bottom of the screen. The goal is to catch the eggs in the hat. At the end of each round, the player has a chance to throw the eggs they have caught back at the chicken for bonus points. The speed of the game increases as the player progresses.

The game has two difficulties; the easier variation gives the player a larger hat for catching eggs.

Reception
Electronic Games in June 1983 called Eggomania "delightful," stating that the game improved on Kaboom! and Avalanche as a "fully-animated delight that might even eclipse its inspiration" with "state-of-the-art graphics on the 2600".

See also
 Chicken

References

External links
Eggomania at Atari Mania

1983 video games
Action video games
Atari 2600 games
Atari 2600-only games
Fictional chickens
Video games about bears
Video games about birds
Video games developed in the United States
U.S. Games games